The war between the kingdoms of Iberia and Armenia (AD 51) is known chiefly through its description in Tacitus' Annals.

The war took place as a delicate balance of power between the Roman and Parthian empires was in place in the Caucasus. Rome was then ruled by Claudius, Parthia by Vologases I. Two Iberian brothers then ruled the Caucasian kingdoms, Pharasmanes I in Iberia, Mithridates in Armenia. They were both dependent on Roman support, which had installed Mithridates on the Armenian throne in 35 AD. However, 15 years later, trust between the brothers had deteriorated, which Tacitus blames on the intrigues of Pharasmanes' son Rhadamistus.

Fearing usurpation by Rhadamistus, his father convinced him to make war upon his uncle and claim the Armenian throne for himself. The Iberians invaded with a large army and surrounded Mithridates at the fortress of Gorneas (Garni), which was garrisoned by the Romans under the command of Caelius Pollio, a prefect, and Casperius, a centurion. Rhadamistus was unable to take the fortress by assault or by siege. Pollio, swayed by bribery from Rhadamistus, betrayed Mithridates and induced the Roman soldiers to threaten the capitulation of the garrison. Under this threat, Mithridates left the fortress in order to make peace with Rhadamistus. Rhadamistus then executed Mithridates and his sons, despite a promise of non-violence, and became King of Armenia. Of this usurpation, Tacitus wrote "Rhadamistus might retain his ill-gotten gains, as long as he was hated and infamous; for this was more to Rome's interest than for him to have succeeded with glory". 

However, faced with this upset of the regional balance and fearing that Armenia and Iberia would unite as a single powerful kingdom in the hands of Rhadamistus, Tiridates entered Armenia with Parthian support in 53 AD. After two years of war, the Armenian nobility revolted and replaced Rhadamistus with the Arsacid prince Tiridates. This was unacceptable to Rome, and started the Roman–Parthian War of 58–63.

References 

Wars involving Armenia
Wars involving the Kingdom of Iberia 
50s conflicts
Wars involving the Roman Empire
50s in the Roman Empire